Daniel Jackson (born 1963) is a professor of Computer Science at the Massachusetts Institute of Technology (MIT). He is the principal designer of the Alloy modelling language, and author of the book Software Abstractions: Logic, Language, and Analysis.

Biography 
Jackson was born in London, England, in 1963.
He studied physics at the University of Oxford, receiving an MA in 1984. After completing his MA, Jackson worked for two years as a software engineer at Logica UK Ltd. He then returned to academia to study computer science at MIT, where he received an SM in 1988, and a PhD in 1992. Following the completion of his doctorate Jackson took up a position as an Assistant Professor of Computer Science at Carnegie Mellon University, which he held until 1997. He has been on the faculty of the Department of Electrical Engineering and Computer Science at MIT since 1997.
In 2017 he became a Fellow of the Association for Computing Machinery.

Jackson is also a photographer, and has an interest in the straight photography style. The MIT Museum commissioned a series of photographs of MIT laboratories from him, displayed from May to December 2012, to accompany an exhibit of images by Berenice Abbott.
Jackson is the son of software engineering researcher Michael A. Jackson, developer of Jackson Structured Programming (JSP), Jackson System Development (JSD), and the Problem Frames Approach.

Research 
Jackson's research is broadly concerned with improving the dependability of software. He is a proponent of lightweight formal methods. Jackson and his students developed the Alloy language and its associated Alloy Analyzer analysis tool to provide support for lightweight specification and modelling efforts.

Between 2004 and 2007, Jackson chaired a multi-year United States National Research Council study on dependable systems.

Selected publications

References

External links 
 Daniel Jackson MIT home page
 Daniel Jackson photography website
 

1963 births
Living people
Photographers from London
Alumni of the University of Oxford
British computer programmers
British expatriate academics in the United States
MIT School of Engineering alumni
Carnegie Mellon University faculty
MIT School of Engineering faculty
English computer scientists
Formal methods people
Software engineering researchers
Computer science writers
20th-century British photographers
21st-century British photographers
Fellows of the Association for Computing Machinery